Asad Raza (born 25 December 1997) is a Pakistani cricketer. He made his List A debut for Khyber Pakhtunkhwa in the 2017 Pakistan Cup on 25 April 2017. He made his first-class debut for Faisalabad in the 2017–18 Quaid-e-Azam Trophy on 9 October 2017. He made his Twenty20 debut for Faisalabad in the 2017–18 National T20 Cup on 12 November 2017.

References

External links
 

1997 births
Living people
Pakistani cricketers
Faisalabad cricketers
Khyber Pakhtunkhwa cricketers
Cricketers from Faisalabad
Central Punjab cricketers